Stormwarning is the ninth studio album by the melodic hard rock band Ten. It was the band's first album after a five-year break. It was released in Japan in January 2011 and in the rest of the world in February the same year. The album cover was designed by Luis Royo. It was the first Ten album to be mixed and mastered by Dennis Ward. The band continued their collaboration with the well known music producer for their subsequent studio albums as well, including the release of the band's latest studio album Here Be Monsters.

Track listing
All songs written by Gary Hughes.

 "Endless Symphony" – 7:26
 "Centre of My Universe" – 6:07
 "Kingdom Come" – 5:35
 "Book of Secrets" – 5:18
 "Stormwarning" – 5:39
 "Invisible" – 5:38
 "Love Song" – 7:07
 "The Hourglass and the Landslide" – 4:49
 "Destiny" – 6:13
 "The Wave" – 5:32
The Asian version (Avalon Records MICP-10972) adds:
"The Darkness" – 4:19

Personnel
Gary Hughes – vocals, guitars, backing vocals
Neil Fraser – lead guitars
John Halliwell – rhythm guitars
Paul Hodson – keyboards, programming
Mark Sumner – bass guitar
Mark Zonder – drums and percussion
Additional guitars by Johnny Gibbons
Jason Thanos - backing vocals

Production
 Mixing/mastering – Dennis Ward

Concepts
The song "Kingdom Come" was inspired by a personal family story of the singer Gary Hughes

Chart positions

References

Ten (band) albums
2011 albums
Frontiers Records albums